Donal O'Neill is an Irish swimmer. He currently holds several Irish records. He competed at the 2009 World Championships and at several European Swimming Championships.

References

External links
RTE

Living people
Irish male swimmers
Year of birth missing (living people)
Place of birth missing (living people)